Ferekalsi Debesay Abrha (born 10 June 1986 in Tsazega) is an Eritrean former professional road cyclist.

Major results

2007
 2nd  Road race, All-Africa Games
 8th Road race, African Road Championships
2009
 1st Prologue & Stage 4 Tour d'Egypt
 9th Overall Tour Eritrea
2010
 1st  Team time trial, African Road Championships
 4th Overall Tour Eritrea
 4th Grand Prix of Al Fatah
 10th Overall Tour of Rwanda
1st Stages 5 & 9
2011
 1st  Team time trial, African Road Championships
 National Road Championships
1st  Road race
2nd Time trial
 2nd Overall Kwita Izina Cycling Tour
 9th Overall Tour d'Algérie
2012
 African Road Championships
1st  Team time trial
3rd Road race
 2nd Overall Tour of Eritrea
 4th Road race, National Road Championships
 6th Overall La Tropicale Amissa Bongo
2014
 1st Stage 4 La Tropicale Amissa Bongo

References

External links

1986 births
Living people
Eritrean male cyclists